Marcos Matías de los Santos Morales (born 28 September 1998) is a Uruguayan professional footballer who plays as a midfielder for Uruguayan Primera División club Peñarol.

Career

Peñarol
A graduate of the club's youth academy, de los Santos made his professional debut for Peñarol on 7 June 2018, coming on as a 57th-minute substitute for Fabián Estoyanoff in a 3-1 victory over Defensor Sporting. The following season, he scored his first goal for the club as part of a brace in a 3-3 draw with Racing Club.

Deportivo Maldonado
In April 2021, de los Santos was loaned out to Deportivo Maldonado after seeing a reduction in his playing time at Peñarol. He made his debut for the club on 16 May 2021, coming on as a halftime substitute for Rodrigo Muniz in a 4-2 defeat to Liverpool.

Career statistics

Club

References

External links

1998 births
Living people
Peñarol players
Deportivo Maldonado players
Uruguayan Primera División players
Uruguayan footballers
Association football midfielders